Ko Yuan-cheng (28 February 1950 – 17 February 2014), better known by his stage names Frankie Kao and Kao Ling-feng, was a Taiwanese singer, television presenter and actor.  His birth name was 葛元誠 (Pe̍h-ōe-jī: Kat Goân-sêng; pinyin: Gé Yuánchéng) and he employed the moniker The Frog Prince (青蛙王子; Pe̍h-ōe-jī: Chheng-oa Ông-chú; pinyin: Qīngwā Wángzǐ) for more than three decades which was given to him by his close friend, comedian Ni Min-jan. He also had a friend named Chang Fei, who is the host of Variety Big Brother. He was known for the song "Flaming Phoenix" (火鳳凰). He was born in Taiwan to Vietnamese parents of Chinese descent

During the height of his career, Frankie Kao commanded an appearance fee of NT$240,000 per night. He exited from his singing career at his peak and ventured into business. His business venture went badly and he returned to his entertainment career.

Kao died of leukaemia on 17 February 2014 at the age of 63.

Filmography

Films

Television

References

1950 births
2014 deaths
Taiwanese Mandopop singers
20th-century Taiwanese male  singers
20th-century Taiwanese male actors
21st-century Taiwanese male actors
Taiwanese male film actors
Deaths from cancer in Taiwan
Deaths from leukemia
Taiwanese people of Vietnamese descent
Male actors from Kaohsiung
Musicians from Kaohsiung